El Real de la Jara is a Spanish municipality located in the province of Seville. According to a 2021 census by INE, the municipality has a population of 1,513.

Notable People 
Carlos Rubén (born 1983), footballer

Gallery

References

External links
El Real de la Jara - Sistema de Información Multiterritorial de Andalucía
El Real de la Jara - El Real de la Jara
Official page of El Real de la Jara - Página oficial de El Real de la Jara

Municipalities of the Province of Seville